is a Japanese football player. He plays for Tochigi City FC.

Career
Tatsuki Kohatsu joined J3 League club Tochigi SC in 2016.

Club statistics
Updated to 22 February 2020.

References

External links
Profile at Tochigi SC

1993 births
Living people
Ryutsu Keizai University alumni
Association football people from Okinawa Prefecture
Japanese footballers
J2 League players
J3 League players
Tochigi SC players
Tochigi City FC players
Association football midfielders